During the 2008–09 Swiss football season, FC Zürich competed in the Swiss Super League.

Season summary
FC Zürich managed to reclaim the Swiss league title (their last as of 2016), but were knocked out of the Swiss Cup in the quarter-finals. The club were knocked out of the UEFA Cup in the first round by Italian giants AC Milan.

First-team squad
Squad at end of season

Left club during season

Notes and references

Notes

References

FC Zürich seasons
Zurich
Swiss football championship-winning seasons